The following elections occurred in the year 1916.

Asia
 1916 Philippine House of Representatives elections
 1916 Philippine Senate elections

Europe
 1916 Finnish parliamentary election

United Kingdom
 1916 Ashton-under-Lyne by-election
 1916 Bolton by-election
 1916 Newington West by-election
 1916 Portsmouth by-election
 1916 Sheffield Hallam by-election
 1916 South Shields by-election

North America

Canada
 1916 British Columbia general election
 1916 Edmonton municipal election
 1916 Nova Scotia general election
 1916 Quebec general election
 1916 Toronto municipal election

United States
 The 1916 Presidential Election
 United States House of Representatives elections in California, 1916
 1916 Minnesota gubernatorial election
 1916 New York state election
 United States House of Representatives elections in South Carolina, 1916
 1916 South Carolina gubernatorial election
 1916 United States House of Representatives elections
 1916 United States Senate elections

United States Senate
 United States Senate election in Massachusetts, 1916
 1916 United States Senate elections

South America 
 1916 Argentine general election
 1916 Guatemalan presidential election
 1916 Nicaraguan general election
 1916 Panamanian presidential election

Oceania

Australia
 1916 Australian plebiscite
 1916 Tasmanian state election

New Zealand
 1916 Pahiatua by-election

See also
 :Category:1916 elections

1916
Elections